Semyon Davidovich Aranovich (Russian: Семён Дави́дович Арано́вич, 23 July 1934, Derazhnya, Ukraine, Soviet Union – 8 September 1996, Hamburg, Germany) was a Soviet and Russian film director.

Life and career
Aranovich attended the Supreme Naval Aviation School in Nikolaev, graduating in 1955, and served for two years in the Soviet naval aviation troops. In 1965, he graduated from VGIK, where he studied under Roman Karmen. While working at the Leningrad Documentary Studio in 1965–1970, Aranovich directed the biographical Time That Is Always with Us (1965) and The Friend of Gorky’s — Andreeva (1966), among other works. Two of his documentaries—one about Maksim Gorky’s last years, made in 1967, and one co-directed with Aleksandr Sokurov on Dmitri Shostakovich (1980) — were shelved and only released during the Perestroika.

His works included the documentaries I Was Stalin's Bodyguard (1990) and The Anna Akhmatova Files (1989) (about the poet) as well as features like Torpedo Bombers (1983), which was his greatest critical and box-office success. His 1994 film The Year of the Dog won the Silver Bear for an outstanding artistic contribution at the 44th Berlin International Film Festival.

He also directed the well-known television miniseries Rafferty in 1980 and Confrontation in 1985.

Andrei Kravchuk has made a documentary about him, Semyon Aranovich: Poslednii Kadr (Semyon Aranovich: The Final Shot).

Selected filmography

Documentary
The Anna Achmatova Files (Личное дело Анны Ахматовой, 1989)
I Was Stalin's Bodyguard (Я служил в охране Сталина, или Опыт документальной мифологии, 1990)

Film and television
...And Other Officials (…И другие официальные лица, 1976)
Summer Trip to the Sea (Летняя поездка к морю, 1978)
Rafferty (Рафферти, 1980, TV)
Torpedo Bombers (Торпедоносцы, 1983)
The Year of the Dog (Год собаки, 1994)
Confrontation (Противостояние, 1985, TV)

References

External links

Torpedo Bombers at Staroe.tv (video viewable inside Russia)

1934 births
1996 deaths
Soviet documentary film directors
Russian film directors
Soviet film directors
Soviet screenwriters
Male screenwriters
People from Khmelnytskyi, Ukraine
Ukrainian Soviet Socialist Republic people
Ukrainian Jews
20th-century Russian screenwriters
20th-century Russian male writers